Karl-Otto Koch (2 August 1897 – 5 April 1945) was a mid-ranking commander in the Schutzstaffel (SS) of Nazi Germany who was the first commandant of the Nazi concentration camps at Buchenwald and Sachsenhausen. From September 1941 until August 1942, he served as the first commandant of the Majdanek concentration camp in occupied Poland, stealing vast amounts of valuables and money from murdered Jews. His wife, Ilse Koch, also took part in the crimes at Buchenwald and Majdanek.

Life

Koch was born in  Darmstadt, Grand Duchy of Hesse-Darmstadt on 2 August 1897. His father worked in a local registrar's office and died when Karl was eight years old. After completing  elementary school in 1912, Koch attended Mittelschule and  completed a commercial apprenticeship.

In 1916, he volunteered to join the Imperial German Army and fought on the Western Front until he was later captured by the British. Koch spent the rest of the war as a POW and returned to Germany in 1919. As a soldier, he conducted himself well and was awarded the Iron Cross Second Class, the Observer's Badge and the Wound Badge in Black. Following World War I, Koch worked as a commercial manager, an authorized signatory and insurance agent and became unemployed in 1932 (he had served a prison sentence in 1930 for embezzlement and forgery). In 1931, Karl-Otto Koch joined the Nazi Party and the Schutzstaffel (SS).

Service with the SS

Koch served with several SS-Standarten (Thirty fifth SS Regiment Kassel, SS Special Detachment Saxony). In 1934, he took command of the Sachsenburg Concentration Camp. Briefly, he was the officer in charge of the Esterwegen Concentration Camp guard unit, officer in charge of the preventive custody camp in the Lichtenburg Concentration Camp, and the adjutant at Dachau Concentration Camp. On 13 June 1935, he became commander of the Columbia concentration camp in Berlin-Tempelhof and, in April 1936, he was assigned to the concentration camp at Esterwegen. Four months later, he was moved to Sachsenhausen. Within a few years (September 1937) he advanced to SS-Standartenführer (colonel).

On 1 August 1937, he was given command of the new Buchenwald concentration camp. He remained at Buchenwald until September 1941, when he was transferred to the Majdanek concentration camp for POWs near Lublin, Poland. That was largely due to an investigation based on allegations of his improper conduct at Buchenwald, which included corruption, fraud, embezzlement, drunkenness, sexual offences and a murder. Koch commanded the Majdanek camp for only one year; he was relieved from his duties after 86 Soviet POWs escaped from the camp in August 1942. Koch was charged with criminal negligence and transferred to Berlin, where he worked at the SS Personnel Main Office and as a liaison between the SS and the German Post Office.

Prosecution and death

Koch's actions at Buchenwald first caught the attention of SS-Obergruppenführer Josias, Prince of Waldeck and Pyrmont in 1941. In glancing over the death list of Buchenwald, Hereditary Prince Josias had stumbled across the name of Walter Krämer, a head hospital orderly at Buchenwald, which he recognized because Krämer had successfully treated him in the past. Hereditary Prince Josias investigated the case and found out that Koch, in a position as the Camp Commandant, had ordered Krämer and Karl Peix, a hospital attendant, killed as "political prisoners" because they had treated him for syphilis and he feared it might be discovered. Josias also received reports that a certain prisoner had been shot while attempting to escape, and discovered that in fact, the prisoner had been told to get water from a well some distance from the camp, then was shot from behind; he had also helped treat Koch for syphilis.

By that time, Koch had been transferred to the Majdanek concentration camp in Poland, but his wife, Ilse, was still living at the Commandant's house in Buchenwald. Waldeck ordered a full-scale investigation of the camp by Georg Konrad Morgen, an SS officer who was an SS-judge in the SS Court Main Office. Throughout the investigation, more of Koch's orders to kill prisoners at the camp were revealed, as well as embezzlement of property stolen from prisoners. The Kochs had used the massive Nazi apparatus to gain an enormous amount of wealth.  

The Kochs were both arrested in 1943. A charge of incitement to murder was lodged by Hereditary Prince Josias and Morgen against Koch, to which were later added charges of embezzlement. Other camp officials were charged, including Koch's wife. The trial resulted in Koch being sentenced to death for disgracing both himself and the SS. Koch was executed by firing squad on 5 April 1945, one week before American allied troops arrived to liberate the camp. His body was subsequently burned in the camp's crematory.

Family

Koch first married in 1924 and had one son; however, this marriage ended in divorce in 1931, due to his infidelity. On 25 May 1936, Koch married Ilse Koch (née Margarete Ilse Köhler), with whom he had a son and two daughters. Ilse later became known as "The Witch of Buchenwald" (Die Hexe von Buchenwald), usually rendered in English as "The Bitch of Buchenwald." When Koch was transferred to Buchenwald, Ilse was appointed an Oberaufseherin (overseer) by the SS and thus had an active, official role in the atrocities committed there. She was known for extreme cruelty towards prisoners.

See also

 Buchenwald Resistance
 Phil Lamason, Allied airman taken to Buchenwald

Notes and references

 Benoît Cazenave, L’exemplarité du commandant SS Karl Otto Koch, Revue de la Fondation Auschwitz, Bruxelles, 2005.

1897 births
1945 deaths
Military personnel from Darmstadt
Holocaust perpetrators in Germany
Holocaust perpetrators in Poland
German prisoners of war in World War I
World War I prisoners of war held by the United Kingdom
Buchenwald concentration camp personnel
People executed by Nazi Germany by firing squad
People from the Grand Duchy of Hesse
SS-Standartenführer
Executed German people
Recipients of the Iron Cross (1914), 2nd class
Majdanek concentration camp personnel
Sachsenhausen concentration camp personnel
People from Hesse executed in Nazi concentration camps
Nazis executed by Nazi Germany
SS personnel
German people who died in Buchenwald concentration camp
Schutzhaftlagerführer
Lichtenburg concentration camp personnel
Nazis executed by firing squad
Executed Nazi concentration camp commandants
Nazis convicted of war crimes
People executed for war crimes
People executed by Nazi courts
Executed mass murderers
People convicted of embezzlement
German Army personnel of World War I